Saïd Mehamha (born September 4, 1990) is a retired Algerian footballer who played primarily as a central midfielder.

Club career

Lyon
Hatai Mehamha began his career at Lyon, joining the youth team in 1997 as a six-year-old. In 2008, he signed his first professional with the club, signing a three year contract. In July 2011, despite having never featured for the first team, the club extended his contract for one more season.

In the summer of 2012, after an unsuccessful trial with Ligue 2 club Lens, Mehamha signed with Algerian club JSM Béjaïa.

International career
Mehamha was a member of the France national under-17 football team at the 2007 UEFA European Under-17 Football Championship in Belgium. Later that year, he captained the Under-17's at the 2007 FIFA U-17 World Cup in South Korea.

In 2010, Mehamha changed his international allegiance from France to Algeria and was subsequently called up to the Algeria national under-23 football team for a friendly match against Qatar.

References

Living people
1990 births
Footballers from Lyon
Association football midfielders
Algeria under-23 international footballers
Algerian footballers
Algerian Ligue Professionnelle 1 players
France youth international footballers
French sportspeople of Algerian descent
JSM Béjaïa players
Olympique Lyonnais players
CF Torre Levante players